Springdale is an unincorporated community in Andover Township, in Sussex County, New Jersey, United States.

Newton Airport is located there.

The Pequest River flows through Springdale.

History
In 1872, it was noted that Springdale had a mill, eight or ten dwellings, and a school that was used for religious services on the sabbath "by ministers of several denominations alternately".

References

Andover Township, New Jersey
Unincorporated communities in Sussex County, New Jersey
Unincorporated communities in New Jersey